The 1941 Auckland City mayoral election was part of the New Zealand local elections held that same year. In 1941, elections were held for the Mayor of Auckland plus other local government positions including twenty-one city councillors. The polling was conducted using the standard first-past-the-post electoral method.

The election saw deputy-mayor John Allum defeating the Labour nominee Joe Sayegh who suffered defeat for the third time in succession. Sayegh did not stand for the council as an inducement to vote for him as mayor, but he was elected to the Harbour Board and Hospital Board. The only successful Labour candidate for the council was Mary Dreaver, with the Citizens & Ratepayers ticket winning all other council seats.

Background
Citizens & Ratepayers
The incumbent mayor Sir Ernest Davis declined to seek a further term. After Davis' retirement the deputy mayor John Allum and councillor Arthur Bailey were seen as likely replacements as the Citizens & Ratepayers Association nominee for mayor. At a meeting chaired by James Donald the Citizens & Ratepayers Association committee selected Allum as the mayoral candidate.

Labour
The Labour Party had six people nominated for the mayoralty:

Bill Anderton, MP for  since 1935 and former city councillor (1935-41)
Mary Dreaver, a Hospital Board member since 1931 city councillor since 1938
Jim Purtell, secretary of the Trades and Labour Council and former city councillor (1936-38)
Joe Sayegh, Labour's mayoral candidate at the previous two elections and former city councillor (1933-41)
Bill Schramm, MP for  since 1931
John Stewart, former city councillor (1935-38)

Sayegh was elected as the Labour candidate at a selection meeting of party delegates.

Others
Two independent candidates also stood. James William Payne, who stood for mayor in 1938, and Charles Bailey, formerly a Labour city councillor from 1933 to 1938.

Mayoralty results

Councillor results

References

Mayoral elections in Auckland
1941 elections in New Zealand
Politics of the Auckland Region
1940s in Auckland